Barry Mitchell (born April 28, 1965) is an American former professional basketball player.

College career
Mitchell attended First Colonial High School in his hometown of Virginia Beach, Virginia. During his time there he was a standout athlete in basketball and earned All-State honors. He then enrolled at Norfolk State where he studied physical education.

At the time, Norfolk State was playing in the NCAA Division II and competed in the Central Intercollegiate Athletic Association. In his 4-year career Mitchell played 119 games, totalling 1,631 points (13.7 average), 928 rebounds (7.8), 502 assists (4.2) and 235 steals (2.0). He recorded 2 triple-doubles in his career, both in the month of February 1987: he had 21 points, 10 rebounds and 11 assists versus Johnson C. Smith on February 27, and 30 points, 10 rebounds and 12 assists versus Shaw on February 4.

He led the team in rebounds for 3 consecutive seasons from 1984 to 1987, in assists in 1985–86 (4.9 average) and 1986–87 (5.1), and was the steals leader in 1986–87. Mitchell was named in the All-CIAA Team for three consecutive seasons from 1985 to 1987.

Professional career
After his 4-year college career, Mitchell was automatically eligible for the 1987 NBA Draft, but he was not selected by an NBA franchise and decided to sign for the Wyoming Wildcatters of the Continental Basketball Association. During his first professional season he appeared in 52 games, averaging 8.4 points, 5.0 rebounds, 2.2 assists and 1.3 steals in regular season play. His team qualified for the playoffs and reached the CBA finals, where they were defeated by the Albany Patroons in 7 games: Mitchell averaged 12.3 points, 7.0 rebounds, 4.5 assists and 2.5 steals in 19 games played during the postseason. Mitchell then decided to join the Youngstown Pride, a team which competed in the World Basketball League, a league that only accepted players 6 ft 5 in tall and under. In three years he experienced significant success, winning the championship in 1989 and 1990 and being named the league's MVP twice. He was also named in the All-Defensive team three times from 1988 to 1990.

He returned to the CBA in January 1991, joining the Quad City Thunder where he played the last 14 games of the regular season and 17 games in the playoffs, where his team lost in the finals to the Wichita Falls Texans. He averaged 8.0 points, 6.0 rebounds, 3.1 assists and 1.5 steals in the regular season, and 13.1 points, 10.7 rebounds, 3.6 assists and 2.9 steals in postseason play.

The 1991–92 CBA season was the best of Mitchell's career. He started 52 of the 55 regular season games he played, and averaged 20.1 points, 8.6 rebounds, 5.0 assists and 2.9 steals, leading the CBA in steals. Mitchell showed again his defensive prowess, and significantly improved his scoring average to 20.1 points per game. He led his team in scoring and rebounding and was named the league's Player of the Year and Defensive Player of the Year, the first time in CBA history in which both awards went to the same player. He started all of his 9 playoffs games, and he averaged 19.7 points, 9.3 rebounds, 6.0 assists and 2.6 steals.

He played two more seasons with the Thunder: the signing of Derek Strong in the 1992–93 season made him the second scoring option, and he averaged 16.7 points, 5.7 rebounds, 5.6 assists and 2.1 steals in 27 games. He did not appear in any of the postseason games. The 1993–94 season was Mitchell's last with the team, and he came from the bench more often, starting only 24 of his 43 games. He averaged 13.0 points, 5.8 rebounds, 4.7 assists and 2.3 steals; he regained his starting role during the playoffs, and in 13 games (all starts) he averaged 16.2 points, 6.5 rebounds, 4.2 assists and 1.7 steals. He led the Thunder to their first CBA Championship,  in five games over the Omaha Racers

Mitchell was one of Quad City Thunder's most successful players and holds several distinctions with the team: he is the all-time leader in steals with 338, and he ranks 2nd in points (2,226), 2nd in minutes played (5,203), 3rd in number of games played (139), 3rd in rebounds (962) and 4th in assists (668).

In 1994 he decided to transfer to Europe and signed with Belgian team Sunair Ostende. He spent several seasons with the club, playing his last game in 1999. During his tenure at Oostende he won the Belgian league once in 1995 and Belgian cup twice in 1997 and 1998.

He then played for Siemens Gent in the 1999–2000 season, and of Liège in the 2001–02 season. He moved to French team Nantes in 2002, playing 15 games with averaged of 6.3 points, 5.9 rebounds 2.8 assists and 1.1 steals.

In 2013–14 he played for B.C. Alleur, in the Belgian lower leagues.

References

External links
Career stats at ProBallers.com
 Stats at Basketinfo.com
 

1965 births
Living people
African-American basketball players
American expatriate basketball people in Belgium
American expatriate basketball people in France
American men's basketball players
Basketball players from Virginia
BC Oostende players
Gent Hawks players
Liège Basket players
Norfolk State Spartans men's basketball players
Quad City Thunder players
Small forwards
Wyoming Wildcatters players
Sportspeople from Virginia Beach, Virginia
21st-century African-American people
20th-century African-American sportspeople